Lollapalooza Chile is the Chile-based version of the popular music festival Lollapalooza. It is held in Santiago, Chile.

History

The annual festival launched in April 2011 in Santiago’s O'Higgins Park and features alternative rock, heavy metal, punk rock and hip-hop bands from both Chile and abroad. It was the first edition of Lollapalooza to take place outside of the United States and was followed by the launch of Lollapalooza Brazil in São Paulo in 2012. Lollapalooza Chile has been held in Santiago since 2011. It's managed by Chilean production company Lotus Productions in partnership with Lollapalooza founder and Jane's Addiction frontman Perry Farrell, and drew crowds of approximately 100,000 in 2011 and 115,000 in 2012.

Acts

Lollapalooza Chile has featured a range of international artists such as The Killers, Jane's Addiction, Kanye West, Deftones, Fatboy Slim, Thirty Seconds to Mars, The Flaming Lips, Arctic Monkeys, Foo Fighters, Björk, MGMT, Tinie Tempah, Sublime with Rome, Foster the People, Calvin Harris and Armin Van Buuren. The 2013 lineup included The Black Keys, Pearl Jam, Queens of the Stone Age, Keane, Deadmau5, A Perfect Circle, Franz Ferdinand, The Hives, and many others.

The festival has also provided an important platform for Chilean music and rock, and shows by Chilean artists have drawn some of its biggest crowds. Featured bands have included Chico Trujillo, Anita Tijoux, Los Bunkers, Javiera Mena, Francisca Valenzuela, Joe Vasconcellos, Gepe, Fernando Milagros, Juana Fe and Los Jaivas. The Chilean contingent of the 2013 lineup included Banda Conmoción, Gepe, De Saloon and Chancho en Piedra. Lollapalooza Chile has also provided a springboard for Chilean artists such as Los Bunkers, Chico Trujillo and Anita Tijoux to play at the original Lollapalooza festival in Chicago.

Lineups by year

2011 

In mid-November 2010, the American musician Perry Farrell announced that the twentieth version of Lollapalooza festival would be held for the first time outside the United States; The site chosen was the Parque O'Higgins in Santiago, Chile, on 2 and 3 April 2011. The event gathered approximately 100,000 people between the O'Higgins Park Ellipse, the Movistar Arena and the Theater Dome.

The organization had many problems, one of them being the cancellation of the Yeah Yeah Yeahs show due to health problems of one of its band members. Problems escalated when Lotus announced that tickets would not be refunded under any circumstances. Added to this, the organizers did not program another band to replace the Yeah Yeah Yeahs, but as time passed they were able to present other artists.

2012 

When the lineup was first revealed it was very poorly received by many festival fans, there were only a few big-name artists such as Björk, MGMT, Joan Jett and Foo Fighters, but by the time the festival finally started many popular artists such as Arctic Monkeys Calvin Harris, Skrillex, Tinie Tempah and Foster the People, among others were in the lineup. This new version of the Festival showed various improvements, such as security, a wider selection of food posts, better information regarding the festival itself and a better atmosphere.

2013 

The lineup was very well received by the people as it brought many quality, big-name artists such as Pearl Jam, Keane, Franz Ferdinand, Queens of the Stone Age, The Black Keys, The Hives, Kaiser Chiefs, deadmau5, Passion Pit, Two Door Cinema Club, Of Monsters and Men, A Perfect Circle, Hot Chip and Foals, and many others.

On January 28, 2013, Lotus released the schedules of each artist on Facebook, with the participation of fans through "likes", which served to open the "curtain" with the schedules of each stage on their website.

2014 

Lollapalooza Chile 2014 was the fourth version of this popular festival in the country. It was held in the O'Higgins Park in Santiago on 29th and 30 March of that year. The final attending number of spectators estimated by Lotus Productions was around 160,000 people, about 80,000 in total.

"In pursuit of the ultimate band of Kidzapalooza", sponsored by Lotus Productions and Coca-Cola Chile, the competition was intended to encourage the participation of young people across Chile between the ages of 14 and 18 years old encouraging them to participate with their own band for the grand prize to appear in the official scenario of Kidzapalooza during the 2014 Lollapalooza Chile Festival. To participate, each band had to send a home video (uncut) of 90 seconds, where all members appeared playing and/or singing. This video had to be sent, together with information of the band, between October 24 and December 22, 2013. The winning band was Mangoré.

2015

The line up was released on November 16, 2014. Jorge Gonzalez, ex leader of a Chilean 80's rock band known as Los Prisioneros cancelled his presentation after suffering a stroke on February 8, 2015. On March 2, it was confirmed that his replacement would be Ana Tijoux.

2016

The sixth version of Lollapalooza Chile was held on 19–20 March 2016. The official 2016 lineup was released on October 6, 2015 and their headliner were; Eminem, Florence + The Machine, Jack Ü, Mumford and Sons.

2017

The seventh version of Lollapalooza Chile was held on 1–2 April 2017. The official 2017 lineup was released on September 28, 2017, headliners will be; Metallica, The Strokes, The Weeknd and The XX. It was the edition with most attendance in the history of Lollapalooza Chile with 85.000 peoples per day. A few days before the festival, was officially revealed a new stage called "Aldea Verde Stage" who is in the Green Spirit Area.

2018

The eighth version of Lollapalooza Chile was held on 16–18 March 2018. It was the first time that the festival was realized in three days. Also, Lollapalooza made an expansion of the park giving to the fans new zones for walk. This version received more than 80,000 attendees per day. This edition was one of the most criticized due to the logistical problems that the festival had due to the electric storms that affected Buenos Aires, Argentina (most of the bands were playing at Lollapalooza Argentina in the same weekend), that affected the arrival of several artists on Saturday and Sunday, even having to cancel some shows and move others. Days before the festival begins, it was announced that Tyler, the Creator would not be able to play at the festival, in his replacement Aurora was confirmed.

2019

The ninth version of Lollapalooza Chile was held on 29–31 March 2019. It is the edition with the most quantity of artists on the lineup that was released on 21 November 2018, it have more than 120 artists. A new expansion it's coming to the park for the ninth edition and also a new stage it's going to be announced on the few weeks. In total, there will be eight stages, three more than the Argentinian and Brazilian editions. The headliners of the 2019 lineup are Kendrick Lamar, Arctic Monkeys, Twenty One Pilots, Lenny Kravitz, Post Malone, Sam Smith and Tiesto. The lineup also include names like The 1975, Dimitri Vegas & Like Mike, Macklemore, Steve Aoki, Portugal. the Man, Interpol, Odesza, Years & Years, Snow Patrol, Bring Me the Horizon, Greta Van Fleet, Ziggy Marley and many others.

2022
The tenth version of Lollapalooza Chile was held on 18–20 March 2022.

See also
 
List of historic rock festivals
List of pop music festivals

References

External links 

 Lollapalooza's Chile official website

Music festivals established in 2011
2011 establishments in Chile
Music festivals in Chile
Tourist attractions in Santiago, Chile
Chilean rock music
Rock festivals in Chile
Electronic music festivals in Chile
Autumn events in Chile